Haunted House is the third EP by the Australian electronic music duo Knife Party, released on 5 May 2013 by Earstorm Records and Big Beat Records. It was announced through their official Twitter page on 8 August 2012.

Background
On 16 April 2013, Knife Party announced on Twitter that they have replaced the track "Baghdad" with a 'VIP' Mix of Internet Friends. Knife Party premiered the official artwork for the EP on 27 April, on their Facebook page. The EP was made available to pre-order in the US on 27 April, with the confirmed release date of 6 May. The EP leaked on 29 April 2013, but the leaked version of "Power Glove" was erroneous because its sub bass was pitched down an octave too low. On 5 May 2013, the EP was uploaded and available to stream in full on Knife Party's official YouTube and SoundCloud accounts. The EP was later released in digital and CD formats a day later. "Power Glove" debuted at #38 on the Scottish Singles Chart and at #43 on the UK Singles Chart on 12 May 2013.

Track listing

Chart performance

References

2013 EPs
Knife Party EPs